Raid in St. Pauli (German: Razzia in St. Pauli) is a 1932 German drama film directed by Werner Hochbaum and starring Gina Falckenberg, Friedrich Gnaß and Wolfgang Zilzer. The film's sets were designed by the art director Willy Schiller.

It was made at the end of the Weimar Republic era. It illustrates both the powerlessness of the ordinary worker as well as an intimate portrait of the joys and sorrows of a small group of people in the harbor section of Hamburg.

Synopsis
A social drama plays out in the harbor area of Hamburg: Ballhaus-Else, a prostitute, lives together with her boyfriend Leo, a peaceful bar musician, in St. Pauli. One day, Matrosen-Karl, a thief on the run, finds a hideout at Else's. She is fascinated by the man, who promises her a more exciting and better life. Together they want to leave Hamburg. Leo – who feels inferior to Karl – lets them go with a heavy heart. But then Karl gets arrested after a fight between the underworld and the police in the Kongo-Bar, and Else returns to Leo – and her hopeless everyday life.

The most important characteristic of this film is the use of local people, including those of somewhat gritty character, as extras playing parts that they actually lived at that time.

Production
Orbis-Film GmbH, Berlin. 
 Producer: Justin Rosenfeld 
 Director: Werner Hochbaum
 Camera: A. O. Weitzenberg 
 Set: Willy Schiller
 Editor: Carl Behr 
 Sound: Franz Schröder
 Music: Kurt Levaal
 Musical treatment and direction: Giuseppe Becce
 Song texts: Carl Behr, Hedy Knorr
 Singer: Charly Wittong, Ernst Busch
 Music Titles: Drive me once rover, drive me once rover (orig title German), In our home town, one always comes back (orig title German) (Behr), Song of the harbor workmen (orig title German) (Knorr), What use is the crown to the emperor? (orig title German).

Cast
 Gina Falckenberg as Ballhaus-Else  
 Friedrich Gnaß as Matrosen-Karl 
 Wolfgang Zilzer as Musiker-Leo  
 Charly Wittong as Volkssänger  
 Max Zilzer as Kneipenwirt  
 Ernst Busch as Sänger
 Kurt Appel 
 Käte Hüter 
 Friedrich Rittmeyer

Film Studio
Vera-Filmatelier Hamburg.  Exterior location: Hamburg. Runtime and film length: 74 min, 2016 m. Format: 35mm, s/w, 1:1.33, Celluloid sound film. Official Certification: 11 April 1932, B.31364, Jv. / DP: 7 December 1933, O.31364, First Official showing: 20 May 1932, Berlin (U.T. Kurfürstendamm). Banned on 7 December 1933 by the Nazi Film Review Office.

Notes

External links
 

1932 films
Culture in Hamburg
German drama films
1932 drama films
Films of the Weimar Republic
1930s German-language films
Films set in Hamburg
Films directed by Werner Hochbaum
German black-and-white films
1930s German films